
Gmina Nowe Piekuty is a rural gmina (administrative district) in Wysokie Mazowieckie County, Podlaskie Voivodeship, in north-eastern Poland.

Villages
Gmina Nowe Piekuty contains the villages and settlements of Hodyszewo, Jabłoń Kościelna, Jabłoń-Dąbrowa, Jabłoń-Dobki, Jabłoń-Jankowce, Jabłoń-Markowięta, Jabłoń-Piotrowce, Jabłoń-Śliwowo, Jabłoń-Spały, Jabłoń-Zambrowizna, Jabłoń-Zarzeckie, Jośki, Koboski, Kostry-Litwa, Kostry-Noski, Krasowo Wielkie, Krasowo-Częstki, Krasowo-Siódmaki, Krasowo-Wólka, Lendowo-Budy, Łopienie-Jeże, Łopienie-Szelągi, Łopienie-Zyski, Markowo-Wólka, Nowe Piekuty, Nowe Rzepki, Nowe Żochy, Piekuty-Urbany, Pruszanka Mała, Skłody Borowe, Skłody-Przyrusy, Stare Żochy, Stokowisko, Tłoczewo and Wierzbowizna.

Neighbouring gminas
Gmina Nowe Piekuty is bordered by the gminas of Brańsk, Poświętne, Sokoły, Szepietowo and Wysokie Mazowieckie.

References

Polish official population figures 2006

Nowe Piekuty
Wysokie Mazowieckie County